The Hohniesen (also known as Bündihorn) is a mountain in the Bernese Alps, located near Frutigen in the Bernese Oberland. It lies between the Diemtigtal and the Frutigtal.

References

External links
 Hohniesen on Hikr

Mountains of the Alps
Mountains of Switzerland
Mountains of the canton of Bern
Two-thousanders of Switzerland